Sara Macgregor or McGregor (died 1919) was a British painter.

Little is known of her life. She exhibited works at the Royal Scottish Academy from 1898 onwards.

A work Stringing the Beads signed and dated 'S.McGregor. 1913.' was auctioned at Christie's in New York, 28 October 1998.

References

1919 deaths
British women painters
19th-century British women artists